Five Islands Football Club is an Antiguan football club based in the northwestern town of Five Islands Village. The club presently competes in the Antigua and Barbuda Premier Division, the highest tier of football in Antigua and Barbuda.

The club finished second during the 2017–18 Antigua and Barbuda Premier Division, their best finish since 1978, where they won the league title.

Squad

Honors 
 ABFA Premier Division
 Winners (1): 1977–78
 Runners-up (1): 2017–18
 Best player: Rafael Torres Rizo  (6 goals)

References

External links 
Five Islands Football Club

Football clubs in Antigua and Barbuda